Au'Diese Mavaire Toney (born November 12, 1999) is an American professional basketball player for the Lakeland Magic of the NBA G League. He played college basketball for the Arkansas Razorbacks of the Southeastern Conference (SEC). He previously played for the Pittsburgh Panthers.

High school career
Toney started his high school career at Columbia High School in Huntsville, Alabama before moving to Northwood Temple Academy in Fayetteville, North Carolina. In his junior season at Trinity Christian School in Fayetteville, he averaged 14.1 points and 7.5 rebounds per game. Toney teamed with future Duke player Joey Baker to lead Trinity to a 25-6 record and an NCISAA 1A state championship. Toney reclassified to the 2018 class, allowing him to bypass his senior season. He committed to playing college basketball for Pittsburgh in June 2018 over offers from Virginia Tech, Ole Miss and Georgia Tech.

College career
In his college debut against Youngstown State, Toney recorded 12 points and nine rebounds. As a freshman at Pittsburgh, Toney averaged 7.5 points and 5.6 rebounds per game but saw his production decline in conference play. On January 28, 2020, he scored a career-high 27 points in a 79–67 loss to Duke. In his sophomore season, Toney averaged 9.5 points and 4.8 rebounds per game. He missed a game against Florida State on February 20, 2021 due to sustaining a concussion in a car accident. As a junior, he averaged 14.4 points and 5.9 rebounds per game in 16 games, before entering the transfer portal on February 25. For his senior season, Toney transferred to Arkansas. On November 23, he posted 19 points and nine rebounds in a 73–67 victory against Cincinnati to win the Hall of Fame Classic, and was named tournament MVP.

Professional career

Lakeland Magic (2022–present)
On November 3, 2022, Toney was named to the opening night roster for the Lakeland Magic.

Career statistics

College

|-
| style="text-align:left;"| 2018–19
| style="text-align:left;"| Pittsburgh
| 32 || 28 || 25.2 || .360 || .246 || .663 || 5.6 || .5 || .7 || .1 || 7.5
|-
| style="text-align:left;"| 2019–20
| style="text-align:left;"| Pittsburgh
| 31 || 25 || 30.5 || .461 || .328 || .655 || 4.8 || 1.2 || 1.2 || .1 || 9.5
|-
| style="text-align:left;"| 2020–21
| style="text-align:left;"| Pittsburgh
| 16 || 16 || 34.9 || .464 || .340 || .667 || 5.9 || 2.3 || 1.3 || .1 || 14.4
|-
| style="text-align:left;"| 2021–22
| style="text-align:left;"| Arkansas
| 36 || 33 || 32.4 || .521 || .290 || .781 || 5.2 || .8 || .6 || .5 || 10.5
|- class="sortbottom"
| style="text-align:center;" colspan="2"| Career
| 115 || 102 || 30.2 || .452 || .300 || .705 || 5.3 || 1.0 || .9 || .2 || 9.9

Personal life
Toney is a cousin of professional basketball players John Petty Jr. and Trevor Lacey.

References

External links
Arkansas Razorbacks bio
Pittsburgh Panthers bio

1999 births
Living people
American men's basketball players
Arkansas Razorbacks men's basketball players
Basketball players from Alabama
Lakeland Magic players
Pittsburgh Panthers men's basketball players
Shooting guards
Sportspeople from Huntsville, Alabama